Theodor Rudolph Hertzberg (June 6, 1817 – 1903) was a businessman, editor, publisher and state legislator in Texas. He served in the state senate during the contentious Twelfth Texas Legislature. He became an immigration commissioner and then a diplomat later in his career.

Life and career

Hertzberg was born in Halberstadt, Prussia. He studied at the University of Jena before emigrating. He reached Galveston, Texas  December 2, 1849. He moved to San Antonio, was a partner in a tobacconist shop, and became a naturalized citizen in 1856. He was a member of the Casino Club and helped organize a German-English School.

An anti-slavery Unionist, He lived in Mexico during the American Civil War. He took over a German language newspaper. He was elected a state senator in 1870. He represented Menard County. He was then appointed to public office. He later became a U.S. diplomat in Europe. He eventually returned to San Antonio. His home there at 155 Crofton Avenue where he lived with his wife and family until he died March 18, 1903, was designated a Texas historical landmark in 1963. Sidney J. Brooks Jr., a pilot who died training for World War I, for whom Brooks Air Force Base is named, also lived in the house.

References

1817 births
1903 deaths
People from Halberstadt
Texas state senators
University of Jena alumni
American people of German descent
19th-century American politicians
Radical Republicans
American abolitionists